Action of 27 August 1661 was a naval battle that took place on 27 August 1661 near Milos, Greece between the Republic of Venice and the Knights Hospitaller over the Ottoman Empire.

Ships involved

Venice/Malta
20 galleys and 2 galleasses

Turkey
36 galleys - 5 sunk, 4 captured

Result
The result was a victory for Venice and Malta over the Ottoman Empire.

References
 

Conflicts in 1661
1661
1661
1661 in Europe
Milos
1661 in the Ottoman Empire
17th century in Greece